The narrow-headed garter snake, Thamnophis rufipunctatus, is a species of garter snake,  endemic to the southwestern United States and adjacent northwestern Mexico. Its common names also include narrowhead garter snake and narrowhead watersnake.

Geographic range
It is found in Arizona and New Mexico, and in the Mexican states of Sonora, Chihuahua and Durango.

Habitat and behavior
It is found near river banks or streams. It is one of the most aquatic of all garter snakes.

Description
The snake is blue-grey to olive-grey, or greenish to brown, and it has brown, orange, or black spots on the back. It has eight or 9 upper labial scaless, one of which enters the eye, two or three preocular scales, two to four postoculars, and one anterior temporal scale. The keeled dorsal scales are arranged in 21 rows at midbody. Ventrals number 152–177; the anal plate is entire; the subcaudals number 65–87, and are divided.

Diet
These snakes are piscivorous, meaning they primarily eat fish. Their diet includes dace, chubs, and both native and introduced trout. They might occasionally prey on salamanders.

Threatened species
The snake has declined in parts of its range, but the International Union for Conservation of Nature (IUCN) has classified it as of "Least concern" because of its wide range, presumably large population, and because the rate of decline is not high. However, its status in Mexico is poorly known; were it in a decline there, it might qualify for a category of higher risk.

The decline is attributed to introduced species (bullfrogs Lithobates catesbeianus, fishes, crayfish), habitat loss and alteration, and sometimes, needless killing and excessive collecting.

Subspecies
Sometimes three subspecies are recognized, including the nominate subspecies:
 T. r. nigronuchalis Thompson, 1957
 T. r. rufipunctatus (Cope, 1875)
 T. r. unilabialis W. Tanner, 1985
However, T. r. nigronuchalis is now commonly held as a full species, i.e., Thamnophis nigronuchalis, whereas the status of T. r. unilabialis is more ambiguous; most recent molecular evidence suggests it is a full species as well (Thamnophis unilabialis).

References

Thamnophis
Reptiles of Mexico
Reptiles of the United States
Reptiles described in 1875
Taxa named by Edward Drinker Cope
ESA threatened species

External Links 
 United States Fish and Wildlife Service Designation of Critical Habitat for the Narrow-Headed Gartersnake